Neils Island (sometimes called Neil Island) is a former island in Sonoma County, California, close to (and formerly surrounded by wetlands of) the Petaluma River, upstream of San Pablo Bay (an embayment of San Francisco Bay). It appears in a 1954 USGS map of the region.

References

Islands of Sonoma County, California
Islands of Northern California
Petaluma River